Akua Lezli Hope is an African-American woman artist, poet and writer.

Early life and education 
Hope was raised in New York City by a "brilliant seamstress and tailor" mother who taught her to crochet at a young age and a father who enthusiastically encouraged her interest in science fiction. She recalls being constantly surrounded as a child by "adults who spoke to [her], told [her] stories, taught [her] songs," inspiring an early interest in literature. Before she knew how to read and write, she dictated original poetry for her mother to transcribe.

Hope took part in a music program in high school, learning to play violin, cello, and bassoon. She also participated as a singer in youth choirs.

Hope holds a B.A. in psychology from Williams College, an M.B.A. in marketing from Columbia University Graduate School of Business, and an M.S.J. in broadcast journalism from Columbia University Graduate School of Journalism.

Career
Hope's artistic output includes crocheted clothing and accessories, handcrafted earrings, and works produced via "weaving, sculpting, hand paper-making, glass casting, flame working, and wire working." She has published more than a hundred original crochet patterns for the use of other artists.

She is a founding member of the Black Writers Union and the New Renaissance Writers Guild. She was an Area Coordinator for Amnesty International.

Hope's poetry and short fiction, much of which pertains to the genres of science fiction and fantasy, has appeared in numerous journals and anthologies and has been partially reunited in collections of her poetry.

In 2021, Hope edited the anthology NOMBONO: Speculative Poetry by BIPOC Poets for Sundress Publications. The same year, she also edited an issue of online poetry journal Eye to the Telescope.

Personal life 
In 2005, Hope was stricken with transverse myelitis, a rare idiopathic auto-immune disease, and became a paraplegic.

Published works

Poetry collections 
 NOMBONO: An Anthology of Speculative Poetry by BIPOC Creators From Around the World (Sundress Publications, 2021)
 Otherwheres (2020)
 Them Gone (The Word Works, 2018)
 Embouchure, Poems on Jazz and Other Musics (ArtFarm Press, 1995)

Recognition
In both 1987 and in 2003, Hope won an Artists Fellowship from the New York Foundation for the Arts. In 1990, she was awarded a Creative Writing Fellowship from the National Endowment for the Arts and in 1993, she was the recipient of a Ragdale U.S.-Africa Fellowship.

Hope held the post of Poet-in-Residence at Chautauqua Institution in 1997 and of Artist-in-Residence at Women’s Studio Workshop in 2001. Also in 2001, she was the recipient of a Hurston-Wright Writers’ Week Fellowship.

Hope's collection Embouchure, Poems on Jazz and Other Musics won the Writer's Digest 1995 poetry book award. Her poem "METIS EMITS" won the 2015 SFPA Poetry Contest in the Short category, and in 2021, her collection Otherwheres placed first in the Chapbook category of the annual Elgin Awards for best speculative poetry book.

In 2022 Hope won an individual artist grant from the NYSCA for her project,"Afrofuturist Pastoral Speculative Poetry."

Hope was named 2022 Grand Master of Fantastic Poetry by the SFPA http://sfpoetry.com/grandmasters.html

Dark Matter: A Century of Speculative Fiction from the African Diaspora, which includes Hope's story "The Becoming," was designated a New York Times notable book.

References

Year of birth missing (living people)
Living people
American women poets
Williams College alumni
Columbia University Graduate School of Journalism alumni
Womanists
Women science fiction and fantasy writers
African-American poets
Poets from New York (state)
African-American women artists
Artists from New York City
20th-century American poets
21st-century American poets
20th-century African-American writers
21st-century African-American writers
20th-century African-American women writers
20th-century American women writers
21st-century African-American women writers
21st-century American women writers